The São Paulo Shimbun (サンパウロ新聞 Sanpauro Shinbun) was a Japanese-language newspaper established in 1946 and published in São Paulo, Brazil. It was one of two Japanese-language newspapers in the city. On January 1, 2019, the newspaper printed its last edition, with no specific plans to continue its operations online.

History  

Founded on October 8, 1946, the Journal São Paulo Shimbun was a vehicle of communication directed towards the Japanese-Brazilian community. Businessman Mituto Mizumoto observed the need that Japanese immigrants had for their own newspaper which would publish facts about Brazil and Japan. The São Paulo Shimbun was authorized to start publishing on September 6, 1946. On October 12 of the same year the first edition was published. As of 2013 Kátia Sattomura was the chief editor of the newspaper's Portuguese-language division. The newspaper publishes Portuguese content over the internet. It printed its last issue on January 1, 2019.

Homage 
In 2011, Scottish musician Momus discovered a copy of the newspaper at the Center for Overseas Migration and Cultural Interaction in Kobe, Japan and wrote "I want someone to make a typeface based on that masthead so I can use it for a future album cover." In 2013, James Goggin created a typeface based on the masthead typography from the newspaper for Momus's album Bambi.

See also
 Japanese Brazilian
 Japanese community of São Paulo
 Nikkey Shimbun

References

External links
  São Paulo Shimbun
  São Paulo Shimbun
  PDF of the First Edition of the São Paulo Shimbun (Archive) - October 12, 1946

1946 establishments in Brazil
2019 disestablishments in Brazil
Asian-Brazilian culture in São Paulo
Japanese-language newspapers
Japanese-Brazilian culture
Mass media in São Paulo
Newspapers published in Brazil
Publications established in 1946
Publications disestablished in 2019